Paolo Ferrari (1822–1889), Italian dramatist, was born at Modena. His numerous works, chiefly comedies, and all marked by a fresh and piquant style, are the finest product of the modern Italian drama. After producing some minor pieces, in 1852 he made his reputation as a playwright with Goldoni e le sue Sedici Commedie. Among numerous later plays his comedy Parini e la Satira (1857) had considerable success. Ferrari may be regarded as a follower of Carlo Goldoni, modelling himself on the French theatrical methods. in 1860 he was appointed professor of History at Modena and afterwards at Milan. His collected plays were published in 1877–1880 in 14 volumes.

References

Italian male writers

1822 births
1889 deaths
Writers from Modena